Cerro Negro de Mayasquer is a volcano on the border of Colombia and Ecuador. These volcanoes, together with Cumbal are andesitic in rock type. A 1936 eruption reported by the Colombian government agency INGEOMINAS may have been from the Ecuadorean volcano Reventador, otherwise the volcano has not erupted for around 160,000 years.

See also 
 List of volcanoes in Colombia
 List of volcanoes in Ecuador
 List of volcanoes by elevation

References

Bibliography

Further reading 
 

Andean Volcanic Belt
Mountains of Colombia
Mountains of Ecuador
Stratovolcanoes of Colombia
Stratovolcanoes of Ecuador
Quaternary South America
Quaternary volcanoes
20th-century volcanic events
Active volcanoes
Geography of Nariño Department
Geography of Carchi Province
Four-thousanders of the Andes